The 1994–95 Temple Owls men's basketball team represented Temple University as a member of the Atlantic 10 Conference during the 1994–95 NCAA Division I men's basketball season. The team was led by head coach John Chaney and played their home games at McGonigle Hall. The Owls received an at-large bid to the NCAA tournament as No. 10 seed in the West region. Temple was defeated by No. 7 seed , 77–71. The team finished with a record of 23–8 (12–4 A-10).

Roster

Schedule and results

|-
!colspan=9 style=| Regular Season

|-
!colspan=9 style=| Atlantic 10 Tournament

|-
!colspan=9 style=| NCAA Tournament

Rankings

References

Temple Owls men's basketball seasons
Temple
Temple
Temple
Temple